Patrick Harty (born 29 January 1991) is a West Indian cricketer. He made his first-class debut on 9 January 2020, for Jamaica in the 2019–20 West Indies Championship.

References

External links
 

1991 births
Living people
Jamaica cricketers
Place of birth missing (living people)